4-Hydroxy-N-propyl-N-isopropyltryptamine (4-HO-PiPT, Piprocin) is a substituted tryptamine derivative which is claimed to have psychedelic effects. It has been sold as a designer drug, first being identified in 2021 in British Columbia, Canada.

See also 
 4-HO-DPT
 4-HO-DiPT
 4-HO-DSBT
 4-HO-McPT
 4-HO-McPeT
 5-MeO-PiPT
 Ebalzotan
 Propylisopropyltryptamine

References 

Tryptamines